UHD may refer to:

Technology
 Ultra-high-definition television
 Ultra HD, any of several high-definition graphics display resolutions
 USRP hardware driver, used with Universal Software Radio Peripherals
 Ultra HD Blu-ray, an enhanced variant of Blu-ray

Other uses
 Universal HD, an American television network
 University of Houston–Downtown
University Hospitals Dorset NHS Foundation Trust, an NHS trust located in the south of England

See also
 Caleb UHD144, a floppy disk system